Simcock House may refer to:

Simcock House (Independence, Kansas), listed on the NRHP in Kansas
Simcock House (Council Grove, Kansas), listed on the National Register of Historic Places in Morris County, Kansas
Simcock House (Swansea, Massachusetts), listed on the NRHP in Bristol County, Massachusetts